is a railway station in the town of Matsushima, Miyagi, Japan, operated by East Japan Railway Company (JR East).

Lines
Takagimachi Station is served by the Senseki Line, and lies 25.5 km from the terminus of the Senseki Line at Aoba-dōri Station. It is also served by trains of the Senseki-Tōhoku Line.

Station layout
The station has one island platform serving two tracks and connected to the station building by a level crossing. The station is staffed.

Platforms

History
Takagimachi Station opened on April 10, 1928, as a station on the Miyagi Electric Railway. The line was nationalized on May 1, 1944. The station was absorbed into the JR East network upon the privatization of JNR on April 1, 1987. The station was closed from March 11 to May 28, 2011 due to damage associated with the 2011 Tōhoku earthquake and tsunami, and services beyond Takagimachi Station in the direction of Ishinomaki Station were suspended and replaced by a provisional bus rapid transit service. The station was reopened on 30 May 2015.

Passenger statistics
In fiscal 2018, the station was used by an average of 1,433 passengers daily (boarding passengers only).

Surrounding area
Matsushima Town Hall
Matsushima Post Office

See also
 List of railway stations in Japan

References

External links

 

Railway stations in Miyagi Prefecture
Senseki Line
Railway stations in Japan opened in 1928
Stations of East Japan Railway Company
Matsushima, Miyagi